Lima Airport Partners S.R.L. is a Limited liability company that operates Peru's main airport: the Jorge Chávez International Airport in Callao, near Lima. It was founded in February 2001 and holds a 30-year concession to operate the airport. The company is 80.01% owned by Fraport AG of Germany.

History
On November 15, 2000, a joint venture consisting of German airport operator Fraport AG Frankfurt Airport Services Worldwide, Bechtel Enterprises International Ltd. - a North American holding originally dedicated to construction - and Peruvian construction company Cosapi S.A. won the thirty-year concession from the Peruvian State to build, operate and transfer the Jorge Chavez International Airport in Callao, Peru.
In December 2001, Bechtel Enterprise Services, Ltd. transferred its LAP shares to Alterra Lima Holdings, Ltd., subsidiary of Alterra Partners, an airport operator whose shareholders are Bechtel and Singapore Changi Airport Enterprise (operator of the Singapore International Airport).
In September 2003, Cosapi S.A. sold its LAP shares to Alterra Holdings, Ltd. Consequently, the distribution of shares turned 57.25% for Alterra Lima Holdings, Ltd. and 42.75% for Fraport AG.
In August 2007, Fraport AG Frankfurt Airport Services Worldwide acquired 57.25% of Alterra Lima Holdings and turned into the main shareholder of Lima Airport Partners.
In June 2008, the International Finance Corporation, member of the World Bank group, and Fund for Investment in Infrastructure, Public Services and Natural Resources, administered by AC Capitales SAFI, became partners of LAP. Therefore, the share distribution turned:
    70.01%, Fraport AG 
    19.99%, International Finance Corporation 
    10.00%, Fund for Investment in Infrastructure, Public Services and Natural Resources

Tenth anniversary
On February 2, 2011, Fraport and Lima Airport Partners celebrated the 10th anniversary of the airport concession in an event attended by important Peruvian business and political leaders as well as by Peru's vice president Luis Giampietri. Stefan Schulte, Fraport's executive board chairman, took the occasion to point out the significant improvements in the quality of infrastructure and services provided as well as the increase in the number of passengers which reached more than 10 million by the end of 2010.

2019
In May 2019, Fraport AG purchased a further 10-percent stake in Lima Airport Partners S.R.L. (LAP) – operator consortium of Jorge Chavez International Airport Lima – from AC Capitales’ Infrastructure Fund, which held the stake for over 10 years. The resulting partnership structure of LAP was as follows: Fraport AG 80.01% and IFC 19.99%.

See also

 Fraport AG
 Jorge Chávez International Airport
 Aeropuertos del Perú
 CORPAC

References

External links
 Official web site of Lima Airport and Lima Airport Partners S.R.L.
  

Airport operators
Transport companies of Peru